The weightlifting competition at the 2019 Southeast Asian Games in the Philippines was held at the Ninoy Aquino Stadium in Manila.

Medal summary

Medal table

Men

Women

References

External links
  
 Results book

2019
Southeast Asian Games
2019 Southeast Asian Games events